William Henry Griffin, CMG (7 August 1812 – 4 November 1900) was a Canadian civil servant. One of the longest-serving members of the Canadian public service, he worked in the Post Office Department for 57 years from 1831 to 1888, raising to the rank of Deputy Postmaster General.

References 

 http://www.biographi.ca/en/bio/griffin_william_henry_12E.html

1812 births
1900 deaths
Canadian civil servants
Canadian Companions of the Order of St Michael and St George
English emigrants to Canada
Canadian postmasters